The action of  15 February 1918 was a naval engagement which occurred during the First World War. The action was fought between an Imperial German destroyer squadron and the lightly armed ships of the Dover Patrol in the Strait of Dover, English Channel.

Background

By the beginning of 1918 a deep mine barrage across the Dover Strait from Folkestone to Cape Gris Nez, on the French coast was in place. The Germans didn't know of its existence as any U-boats that came across it were destroyed. The minefield worked in combination with a squadron of Royal Navy trawlers who, upon sighting a submarine, would drive it into the minefield by means of gunfire and flares.  Between 18 December 1917 and 9 February 1918, five German submarines had been sunk in the minefield. The Germans didn't know about the minefield and thought the Royal Navy ships were sinking the submarines. The Imperial German Naval command decided to send a Destroyer unit to attack the Royal Navy ships.

Action
British forces in the Channel sighted a submarine around 1:00 AM on 15 February 1918. As drifters attempted to force the submarine into the minefield in the usual manner, they were attacked by a force of German destroyers. The German ships appeared to use one destroyer to illuminate the target with a searchlight long enough for the other ships to get the range at which point the entire group would fire. The German destroyers enjoyed a considerable advantage in firepower over the smaller and scattered enemy craft and moved from one British vessel to the next, destroying each in turn.

In a similar fashion the Violet May was attacked and heavily damaged. Two Enginemen, Ewing and Noble, were able to launch a boat and row to safety. When the Germans left, they rowed back and re-boarded their burning ship, treated wounded and brought the fires under control, thus saving their ship. When dawn broke the drifter Courage towed them to Dover. The two engineers each were awarded the Conspicuous Gallantry Medal.

Aftermath

Ships lost

Annotations

Bibliography
Notes

References
 
 
 
 

Naval battles of World War I involving Germany
Naval battles of World War I involving the United Kingdom
North Sea operations of World War I
Conflicts in 1918
February 1918 events